Seyyed Mahalleh (also Romanized as Seyyed Maḩalleh) is a village in Howmeh Rural District, in the Central District of Masal County, Gilan Province, Iran. At the 2006 census, its population was 168, in 53 families.

References 

Populated places in Masal County